Cooerwull railway station was a railway station on the Main Western railway line in New South Wales, Australia.

History
The station was established during World War II to assist workers commuting from the Blue Mountains to employment in the iron, steel and small arms industries in Lithgow. It also serviced a number of hostels for munitions workers which had been built along the northern side of the railway line.

The station closed in 1974 when services to Bowenfels were cut back to Lithgow. In 2002 the station footbridge was identified as the last of its design still standing in Australia, and was relocated to Top Points station on the Zig Zag Railway. The remainder of the station has been incorporated into the Great Zig Zag public reserve as a relic of Lithgow's industrial heritage.

References

Disused regional railway stations in New South Wales
Main Western railway line, New South Wales
Railway stations in Australia opened in 1941
Railway stations closed in 1974